The Guadalajara Open Akron is a WTA 500-level professional women's tennis tournament. It takes place on outdoor hardcourts, and was introduced in 2022 to be played in the month of October at the Panamerican Tennis Center in the city of Zapopan, Mexico (Guadalajara metro area). The tournament was introduced due to the suspension of all WTA tournaments in China following the Peng Shuai sexual assault and disappearance controversy and in Russia following the country's invasion of Ukraine. After successfully staging the 2021 WTA Finals in Guadalajara, the tournament organizers were hoping to host another big event in 2022 for which they were rewarded by WTA.

Results

Singles

Doubles

See also
 Abierto Zapopan
 Jalisco Open
 Guadalajara Open

References

External links
 Official website

Tennis tournaments in Mexico
Hard court tennis tournaments
WTA Tour
Annual events in Mexico
2022 establishments in Mexico